"Thunder Island" is a song by American musician Jay Ferguson. It is the title track and lead single from the 1977 album of the same name. The song peaked at No. 9 on the US Billboard Hot 100 the week of April 1, 1978. The recording features Joe Walsh on guitar. In Canada, it reached No. 8.

As "Thunder Island" was Ferguson's highest-ranking song on the charts, he is sometimes tagged a one-hit wonder. However, he achieved an additional hit with the song "Shakedown Cruise" which reached No. 31 on the Hot 100 the week of June 23, 1979.

Chart performance

Use in popular culture

The 2013 film Anchorman 2: The Legend Continues 
Episode 13 of Season 5 of the TV show Breaking Bad
The 2004 film Miracle 
In "Island Adventure", a Season 17 episode of the TV show Family Guy
Episode 4 of Season 4 of the TV series Good Girls

References

External links
 

1977 songs
1977 singles
Jay Ferguson (American musician) songs
Asylum Records singles
Songs written by Jay Ferguson (American musician)
Song recordings produced by Bill Szymczyk